The women's lightweight (60 kilograms) event at the 2018 Asian Games took place from 25 August to 1 September  2018 at Jakarta International Expo Hall, Jakarta, Indonesia.

Like all Asian Games boxing events, the competition was a straight single-elimination tournament. Oh Yeon-ji of South Korea won the gold medal. She beat Sudaporn Seesondee from Thailand in the final bout 4–1. Huswatun Hasanah from Indonesia and Choe Hye-song of North Korea shared the bronze medal.

Schedule
All times are Western Indonesia Time (UTC+07:00)

Results 
Legend
RSC — Won by referee stop contest

References

External links
Official website

Boxing at the 2018 Asian Games